Omni-Man (Nolan Grayson) is a fictional character in the Image Universe, created by writer Robert Kirkman and artist Cory Walker (with Ryan Ottley) as an expansion of a character concept created by Alan Moore and Chris Sprouse. Omni-Man is the father of Invincible and a member of the Viltrumite race, a humanoid species of extraterrestrial origin who possess immense powers, working as a superhero on Earth. As is customary for males of his species, Omni-Man sports a large moustache. Omni-Man appears in Supreme, Invincible, Noble Causes, and Dynamo 5.

In the Invincible television series, Omni-Man is voiced by J. K. Simmons.

Publication history
Omni-Man (as Omniman) was first referenced in Alan Moore's and Chris Sprouse's Supreme: The Story of the Year (August 1996–September 1997), in which the titular Supreme (in his civilian identity of Ethan Crane) would illustrate the adventures of Omniman. Robert Kirkman would officially introduce Omni-Man as the father of the titular character in his comic series Invincible (January 2003–February 2018), redesigned by Cory Walker and Ryan Ottley as a black-haired, moustachioed man compared to his Supreme design of blonde hair and a clean-shaven face.

Fictional character biography

Supreme
In Supreme: The Story of the Year, the superhero Supreme (upon adopting the civilian identity of Ethan Crane) begins drawing the adventures of Omni-Man (spelled Omniman) as a comic book artist for Dazzle Comics, imagining his secret identity as that of Spencer Samson, and his love interests as Linda Lake and Lyra Lemuria alongside writer and Omniman creator Diana Dane. Later, supervillain Cyber-Zerk attacks Supreme's place of work in search of Omniman, assuming the comic to be accurate to life, and kidnapping Dane in an attempt to draw him out, subsequently mistaking Supreme for Omniman. Later, Supreme encounters a real-life version of the Dazzle Comics Omniman in his office after finding a comic book depicting his own life as it is happening. After questioning their respective existences and accusing the other to be fictional, Omniman and Supreme decide to demonstrate each other's powers in a brawl, with Diana helping Supreme by proving background on Omniman's powers. Ultimately, after breaking character, "Omniman" reveals to himself to be the inter-dimensional Szazs, the Sprite Supreme, having imitated Supreme's Omniman in an attempt to win the Impolympics.

Following a multiversal war and a subsequent "revision" of Earth's history in Erik Larsen's Supreme, set during the events of Invincible, the real Omni-Man faces a "mean" Supreme after he viciously beats Suprema into a coma and goes on a killing spree, murdering criminals to re-establish his position as the most powerful superhero on the planet, while Dane, the "modern" Supreme and other surviving Supremes of the Supremacy, having been stripped of their superpowers, adjust to their helplessness in ending "mean" Supreme's rampage. After bringing their fight to the moon, knocking the "mean" Supreme unconscious, Omni-Man is surprised when the "mean" Supreme is captured by Khromium, while on Earth, Dane and Supreme are amazed to see a real-life version of their character brought to life, after finding Dazzle Comics to no longer exist.

Invincible
In Invincible, Omni-Man arrived on Earth in the 1980s, where he eventually adopted the secret identity of a best-selling author named Nolan Grayson. He married Debbie, whose life he had saved, and they had a son together named Mark Grayson. In issue number 7, Nolan lures Earth's premiere superhero team, the Guardians of the Globe, to their hideout in Utah, where he brutally murders all the members. It was later revealed that the Immortal, the Guardians' leader, had been resurrected by the supervillain duo the Mauler Twins in an attempt to brainwash and control him. Remembering Omni-Man's betrayal, Immortal tracked down Nolan and battled him in public, outing him as the murderer and villain he truly is before being killed yet again. Nolan reveals that he was sent to Earth as a conqueror for the Viltrum Empire, a revelation that was in stark contrast to his previous claims that his presence was to advance human technology and protect the Earth from extraterrestrial dangers. In a confrontation shortly thereafter, Omni-Man beats Mark to within an inch of his life, yet he refuses to kill him before he flees the planet.

It was further revealed that Nolan had found a new planet over which to rule, in the hopes of offsetting some of the consequences of his earthly failure. Nolan's rise to power, however, was entirely peaceful. The custom of the native inhabitants, the Mantis Aliens (an insectoid people who live entirely within a nine-month span), was to simply choose the oldest among them to act as their leader. As on Earth, Nolan has taken a native wife, Andressa, and sired a second son, Oliver (who subsequently begins to use the codename "Kid Omni-Man" when he accompanies Invincible back to Earth). The genetic differences between Viltrumites and the mantis-people were more apparent, though, than they were with humans. This caused the child to age much more slowly than his mother's species, but much faster than his father's.

Omni-Man's attempts to appease the Viltrum Empire ended in failure with his defeat and capture at the hands of his own people. He was held captive in prison until the Empire was able to send the required Viltrumite executioners. His parting words to Mark were "Read my books, Mark. My books..." In a conversation with his tailor Art Rosenbaum, Mark learns that the books Nolan referred to were not his well-known travel books, but a series of failed science fiction "novels". While Arthur suspected that the stories were Viltrumite folklore, Mark quickly realized that they were, in fact, first-person accounts of Nolan's own missions to destroy potential threats to the Viltrum Empire, which could provide the secrets to defeating the Viltrumites.

He is later saved on the day of his execution by Allen the Alien, to whom he agrees to reveal the "secret": Viltrumites are a near-extinct race, with fewer than fifty pure-blood able individuals left. Emboldened by the incredible strength shown by his new ally, he begins a two-men campaign to eradicate Viltrum's supremacy. Embarking on adventures across the galaxy, they gather weapons and allies which will give them an advantage over the Viltrumites, before returning to Earth to collect Mark and Oliver. They are briefly waylaid by the Viltrumite champion Conquest, an old enemy of Invincible who is killed in the ensuing battle, but not before Mark is critically injured. Nolan spends the subsequent months bonding with Oliver while Mark heals.

In the final battle of the war, the anti-Viltrumite coalition is victorious, destroying the Viltrumite homeworld and scattering their enemies, although Nolan is badly wounded by the Viltrumite regent Thragg, who secretly relocates the surviving members of his race on Earth, planning to interbreed with humans to covertly rebuild the empire. Tensions mount when Thragg discovers that Nolan is a descendant of the long-dead Viltrumite king, and thus heir to the throne, provoking a fierce battle between them. Although Nolan is overpowered, the Viltrumites recognize him and rally behind him, forcing Thragg to flee. Nolan is subsequently crowned as ruler of the Viltrum Empire.

Nolan Grayson manages to overlook the Viltrumites on Earth and sees how the Viltrumites changed for the better and see Earth as their new home. Nolan learns that Anissa raped Mark, and is saddened at Oliver's death. In the final confrontation between the Viltrumites and Thragg's army, Nolan was killed by Thragg. In his last words to Mark, Nolan Grayson names Mark as his successor to be the Emperor of Viltrumites. In the future, his grandson (Marky) visits Nolan's grave and promises to live up to his father's legacy.

Dynamo 5
In Dynamo 5: Sins of the Father, Omni-Man (alongside Captain Dynamo, Supreme, and the Savage Dragon) defeats Dominex in combat thirty years prior to the series' events, in which Dominex's three sons seek to regain their family's honour (after their father had been spared from execution and sent him back to his home planet in shame) by fighting Invincible and the Dynamo 5.

Powers and abilities
In addition to having all the generic powers and abilities of a Viltrumite, Omni-Man ranks among the most powerful Viltrumites to ever exist. He has superhuman strength, able to easily lift immense amounts of weight and tear through virtually any matter; this places him as the single most powerful being on Earth. He has super speed, able to close tremendous distances in seconds and likewise react to the fastest of opponents. He is nigh-invulnerable, immune to all forms of illness or contamination and able to withstand physical harm from all but the strongest of dangers. He has an enhanced healing factor, able to recover from any damage he does sustain in remarkably short periods of time with no lingering side-effects. He has nigh-limitless stamina, able to continue his exertions for long periods of time with no effect to his performance and endure any damage he does sustain unhindered. He is also able to levitate and fly. While still needing air, Omni-Man can endure weeks holding his breath and likewise can survive the vacuum of space unprotected, allowing for unaided interstellar travel. Omni-Man is blessed with an immense longevity. This stems from a decelerated aging process, gradually aging slower the older he gets, allowing him to retain his youthful health, vitality, conditioning, and appearance for an incalculably long time. At over two thousand years old, he has only begun to show signs of aging while still physically performing in his prime. Also as a Viltrumite, Omni-Man's genetics are so potent, they almost completely overshadow any genetics his offspring will inherit from the other parent, making said offspring almost purely Viltrumite themselves.

In other media
Omni-Man appears in the Invincible streaming television series, voiced by J. K. Simmons to positive critical reception, spawning several internet memes.

Omni-Man appears in the web series Death Battle where he battled Homelander from The Boys and won.

Reception
Omni-Man was ranked as IGNs 93rd-greatest comic book hero/villain of all time. The website cited his charismatic moustache in its ranking.

The character has been compared to Superman, Vegeta from the Dragon Ball franchise, and Homelander from The Boys comic series and its TV adaptation.

References

Characters created by Robert Kirkman
Comics characters with superhuman senses
Fictional assassins in comics
Fictional characters with slowed ageing
Fictional characters with superhuman durability or invulnerability
Fictional defectors
Fictional genocide perpetrators
Fictional mass murderers
Fictional military personnel in comics
Fictional military personnel in television
Fictional military spies
Fictional prison escapees
Fictional rampage and spree killers
Fictional secret agents and spies in comics
Fictional secret agents and spies in television
Fictional sleeper agents
Fictional soldiers
Fictional terrorists
Fictional war criminals
Fictional warlords
Fictional writers
Image Comics extraterrestrial superheroes
Image Comics extraterrestrial supervillains
Image Comics characters who can move at superhuman speeds
Image Comics characters with accelerated healing
Image Comics characters with superhuman strength
Image Comics male superheroes
Image Comics male supervillains
Invincible (comic)
Skybound Entertainment superheroes
Skybound Entertainment supervillains
Parodies of Superman
Superheroes with alter egos
Internet memes introduced in 2021
Film and television memes